The Heike Nōkyō , is a collection of Buddhist religious texts in Japan from the late Heian period. These texts include 33 scrolls of the Lotus Sutra, one Amitabha Sutra scroll, one Heart Sutra scroll and one prayer scroll dedicated to the Itsukushima Shrine. The Nōkyō is written in a form of Japanese known in English as Classical Japanese.

It has had a profound influence on Japanese culture and Japanese art and was created during a golden age of Japanese art history. It is one of the masterpieces of decorated sutras ( sôshoku kyô ) of the Heian period Emakimono texts and is considered a National Treasure of Japan.

History and development 
The Nōkyō was commissioned by the Taira clan and dedicated by Taira no Kiyomori (1118-81CE) to Itsukushima Shrine in 1164CE in a prayer scroll (Heike Nogyo). It was made by aristocratic circles in the 12th century and depicts the tale of the Heike, numbering 33 to represent the 33 goddesses found at Itsukushima who were said to take the form of Kannon. 
The Nokyo was written in Classical Japanese, Classical Chinese and the Kana script formatted as Ashida-E (reed writing) representing a votive and religious work of Heian-specific Art.

In 1602, the Rinpa painter Tawaraya Sotatsu was commissioned to restore the Nokyo which affected his painting.

Gallery

See also 
 Tale of Genji
 Japanese painting
 Heian period
 History of Japanese art
 Nara Research Institute for Cultural Properties
 Tokyo Research Institute for Cultural Properties

References

Japanese art
Heian period
Paintings
Lists of works of art
Japanese painting
Chinese paintings